Bert Cook may refer to:
Bert Cook (basketball) (1929–1998), American basketball player
Bert Cook (footballer) (born 1889), English footballer
Bert Cook (rugby), New Zealand rugby union and rugby league footballer

See also
Bert Cooke (disambiguation)
Albert Cook (disambiguation)
Herbert Cook (disambiguation)
Robert Cook (disambiguation)
Bertie Cook, fictional character in Trial by Combat